Callista is a genus of saltwater clams, marine, bivalve molluscs in the family Veneridae, the venus clams.

Species
Species within the genus Callista include:
 Callista bardwelli Clench & Mclean, 1936 
 Callista brevisiphonata Carpenter, 1865 
 Callista chinensis Holten, 1802 
 Callista chione (Linnaeus, 1758) 
 Callista costata Dillwyn, 1817 
 Callista erycina Linnaeus, 1758 
 Callista eucymata Dall, 1890 
 Callista florida Lamarck, 1818 
 Callista grata Deshayes, 1853 
 Callista impar Lamarck, 1818 
 Callista maculata (Linnaeus, 1758) 
 Callista multiradiata Sowerby, 1851 
 Callista phasianella Deshayes, 1854 
 Callista pilsbryi Habe, 1960 
 Callista planatella Lamarck, 1818 
 Callista politissima Kuroda, 1945 
 Callista roscida Gould, 1861 
 Callista semisulcata Sowerby, 1851 
 Callista squalida Sowerby, 1835

 Extinct species
 †Callista elegans Lamarck 1806 - Age range: 48.6 to 40.4 Ma, found only at Falunière de Grignon (Eocene of France)

References

External links 
 

Veneridae
Bivalve genera